Jaume I is a station in the Barcelona Metro network, located under Via Laietana, an important avenue in Ciutat Vella, right between Plaça de Ramon Berenguer el Gran and Plaça d'Emili Vilanova. It can be accessed from Plaça de l'Àngel and Carrer d'Argenteria, on the other side of Via Laietana.

The station serves Transports Metropolitans de Barcelona-operated L4. The other L3 stations (Correos and Banco) that were located in Via Laietana are now closed.

Atypical of downtown Barcelona metro stations, its two platforms are on the same level, and divide the station into two parts.

On December 28, 2018, the station became accessible for wheelchair users.

Services

See also
James I of Aragon, its namesake.
List of Barcelona Metro stations
List of disused Barcelona Metro stations

External links

Jaume I at Trenscat.com

Railway stations in Spain opened in 1926
Transport in Ciutat Vella
Barcelona Metro line 4 stations